Jomel Andrel Warrican (born 20 May 1992) is a West Indian cricketer. He is a slow left-arm orthodox bowler and a right-handed tail-end batsman.

In September 2015 he was named in the Test squad for the West Indies tour to Sri Lanka. He made his Test debut against Sri Lanka on 22 October 2015, taking 4 wickets for 67 runs on the first day.

Early career
Born in Saint Vincent, Warrican moved to Barbados and attended Combermere School and joined the Empire Cricket Club. He was awarded the Lord Gavron Award for promising young cricketers in Barbados alongside Jason Holder in 2009 before representing the West Indies at the 2010 ICC Under-19 Cricket World Cup.  He was the second Gavron Award winner to spend a season playing for Sefton Park in the Liverpool and District Cricket Competition in 2011, taking 51 wickets and scoring 373 runs.  Warrican continued to impress on his return to the Caribbean and made his first-class debut for Barbados in March 2012 although a regular place wasn't claimed until his success in the 2014 season when he both led the BCA Elite Cricket league wicket-takers and broke the record for a slow bowler as he helped Empire to win the 3-day game championship.  This form was carried in the Regional Four Day Competition where he took 49 wickets including two 8 wicket hauls.

In June 2020, Warrican was named as one of eleven reserve players in the West Indies' Test squad, for their series against England. The Test series was originally scheduled to start in May 2020, but was moved back to July 2020 due to the COVID-19 pandemic.

References

External links
 

1992 births
Living people
Barbados cricketers
West Indies Test cricketers
Place of birth missing (living people)
St Kitts and Nevis Patriots cricketers
Saint Vincent and the Grenadines cricketers
Saint Vincent and the Grenadines emigrants to Barbados